"Suzy Lee" is a love song by the American rock band The White Stripes from their 1999 self-titled album.

The name Suzy Lee appears in the song as well as other instances throughout the White Stripes' discography, most notably from their 2001 album White Blood Cells, in the song "We're Going to Be Friends", and the dedication of Get Behind Me Satan in which Jack White dedicated the album to Suzy Lee, "Wherever she may be..." It is rumored that Suzy Lee was a childhood friend of his.

Music
Unlike most of the White Stripes' alternative rock and folk rock songs, "Suzy Lee" draws a large influence from blues music, most obviously with the use of a slide guitar throughout the song, played by Johnny Walker of Soledad Brothers. Although it is different from many of their other songs, a characteristically simple and heavy drum beat, played by Meg White, largely drives the song's melody.

References

1999 songs
The White Stripes songs
Songs written by Jack White